Promises Kept is Champion's first full-length album. It was released in 2004 on Bridge 9 Records.

Track listing
 "Promises Kept"
 "Looking Back"
 "Next Year"
 "Decisions Made"
 "Miles to Go"
 "The Truth"
 "Perspective"
 "Failure"
 "The Decline"
 "The Break"
 "Different Directions"
 "Every Word"

References

Champion (band) albums
2004 albums
Bridge 9 Records albums
Albums produced by Kurt Ballou